George Jan Kooymans (born 11 March 1948, The Hague, Netherlands) is a Dutch guitarist and vocalist. He is best known for his work with the Dutch group Golden Earring. Kooymans wrote "Twilight Zone", the group's only Top 10 Pop Single on the US Billboard Hot 100, which hit No. 1 on the Billboard Top Album Tracks chart.<ref>Whitburn, Joel (2010). The Billboard Book of Top 40 Hits',' 9th Edition (Billboard Publications), page 259.</ref>

Kooymans also wrote and produced for other artists. In 2017 and 2018 he released two albums as a member of Vreemde Kostgangers (Strange Boarders), a Dutch-language supergroup he formed with Henny Vrienten (bass player of the band Doe Maar) and singer-songwriter Boudewijn de Groot.

Kooymans is married to Melanie Gerritsen, the younger sister of Golden Earring bassist Rinus Gerritsen. Kooymans primarily played a Gibson Les Paul, a Gretsch 6119, a Fender Stratocaster, a Gibson Marauder, a Gibson SG, a Yamaha SG2000, several BC Rich guitars, a double cutaway Gibson Melody Maker and a Gibson Firebird, with his primary amps being a Roland Jazz Chorus, a Vox AC30 amp, and a Fender Twin Reverb.  

In February, 2021, Kooymans announced that he was suffering from amyotrophic lateral sclerosis (ALS) and would retire.  Shortly afterward, Golden Earring announced they would disband.

Discography
Golden Earring

Solo albumsJojo (1971)Solo (1987)On Location'' (as Kooymans-Carillo with Frank Carillo) (2010)

Singles
"Lovin' and Hurtin'" / "For Gail" 1971
"Lost For Love" / "The Devil Rides Again Tonight" 1987
"The Beat Goes On" / "Again" 1987
"World of Our Own" / "All Things Are Light" 1987

References 

1948 births
Living people
Musicians from The Hague
Dutch rock guitarists
Dutch male guitarists
Golden Earring members
People with motor neuron disease
20th-century Dutch people